Provincial Trunk Highway 39 (PTH 39) is a provincial highway in the Canadian province of Manitoba. It runs from PTH 6 (to Thompson) to PTH 10 (to Flin Flon).

The highway is directly north of PTH 60, which has the same function as PTH 39. The speed limit is 100 km/h (62 mph).

Together with the section of PTH 6 between Ponton and Thompson, PTH 39 was originally designated as PR 391. A further, more northerly and only partly paved section of Provincial Road 391, doubling back westward from Thompson to Lynn Lake, continues to bear that designation.

039